Cuatro, Spanish (and other Romance languages) for the number 4, may refer to:

 Cuatro (instrument), a family of Latin American string instruments, including:
 Cuatro (Venezuela)
 Puerto Rican cuatro
 Cuatro (TV channel), a Spanish free-to-air television channel
 TV4 (Guanajuato), or TV Cuatro, a state-owned public broadcaster serving Guanajuato, Mexico
 ¡Cuatro!, a 2013 documentary by Green Day
 Cuatro (album), a 1992 album by Flotsam and Jetsam

See also 

 
 
 Cuarto (disambiguation)
 Quatro (disambiguation)
 Quattro (disambiguation)